Antero Vanhanen (1 April 1935 – 30 December 1986) was a Finnish wrestler. He competed in the men's Greco-Roman light heavyweight at the 1960 Summer Olympics.

References

1935 births
1986 deaths
Finnish male sport wrestlers
Olympic wrestlers of Finland
Wrestlers at the 1960 Summer Olympics
Sportspeople from Saint Petersburg